Divide Mountain is located in the Lewis Range, Glacier National Park in the U.S. state of Montana. Divide Mountain is located south of Saint Mary, Montana on the border of Glacier National Park and the Blackfeet Indian Reservation.

Divide Mountain is also notable as the line parent of Mount Mitchell, North Carolina, which is the highest point in the Eastern United States.

See also

 Mountains and mountain ranges of Glacier National Park (U.S.)

References

Mountains of Glacier County, Montana
Mountains of Glacier National Park (U.S.)
Lewis Range
Mountains of Montana